Josef Hügi (23 January 1930 – 16 April 1995) was a Swiss international footballer who played as a striker during the late 1940s, 1950s and early 1960s.

Career 
Hügi was born in the town of Riehen on 23 January 1930 and played football from an early age but did not start to take the sport all that seriously until he went to the University of Basel in the late 1940s. His first professional club was FC Basel, whom he signed for in 1948. He would spend the next fourteen years of his life playing for the RotBlau, playing  320 league matches and scoring 224 goals. In 1962, he signed for FC Zürich but he played just two games there and went on to spend the rest of his career in the lower divisions with FC Porrentruy and FC Laufen. He became a coach at FC Basel after his retirement from playing.

He was capped 34 times for the Swiss national team between 1951 and 1960, scoring 22 goals. At the 1954 FIFA World Cup, he scored six goals, tied second-best for the tournament, which makes him the all-time top goalscorer for Switzerland in World Cups.

Honours 
Basel
Swiss Super League: 1952–53

References

External links 
Josef Hügi player profile 

1930 births
1995 deaths
Swiss men's footballers
Association football forwards
1954 FIFA World Cup players
Switzerland international footballers
FC Basel players
FC Zürich players
FC Laufen players
Swiss-German people
People from Riehen
Swiss Super League players
Footballers from Basel